Homeostatic feeling is a class of feelings (e.g. thirst, fatigue, pain, malaise and well-being) that inform us about our physiological condition. In his earlier work Antonio Damasio used "primordial feeling" but he now prefers the term "homeostatic feeling" for the class: "Homeostatic feelings are feelings such as hunger, thirst, pain, desire, wellbeing, as well as the continuous feelings of life itself." 

Jaak Panksepp identified homeostatic feeling as one of three primary classes of affect: 
homeostatic affect: e.g., thirst, fatigue
sensory affect: e.g., touch, warmth
emotional affect: e.g., anger, fear. 

Some homeostatic feelings motivate specific behavior aimed at maintaining the body in its ideal state. For example,  thirst motivates drinking, fatigue motivates resting and pain motivates withdrawing and protecting.  

Derek Denton called these motivating homeostatic feelings "primordial emotions" and defined them as "the subjective element of the instincts, which are the genetically programmed behaviour patterns which contrive homeostasis. They include thirst, hunger for air, hunger for food, pain, hunger for specific minerals etc. There are two constituents of a primordial emotionthe specific sensation which when severe may be imperious, and the compelling intention for gratification by a consummatory act."

Neuroanatomist Arthur Craig calls these motivating homeostatic feelings "homeostatic emotions" and has found that humans and anthropoid primates form an image of all of the body's unique homeostatic sensations in the brain's primary interoceptive cortex (located in the dorsal posterior insula). This image is re-represented in the mid- and anterior insula, and the anterior insula's image (modulated by input from cognitive, affective and reward-related circuits) embodies conscious awareness of the whole body's homeostatic state. A sensation re-represented in the anterior insula and that sensation's related motivation hosted in the anterior cingulate cortex form a homeostatic emotion.

Consciousness
Derek Denton proposed that primordial emotions are the likely precursors to consciousness; that a kind of non-reflective consciousness evolved along with these feelings and before the emergence of cognition. This opposes the view put by Edelman and others that consciousness emerged after the development of cognitive processes such as the ability to create a scene from diverse sensory inputs.

Denton saw the evolution of consciousness as a gradual, continuous process, beginning in the brain's most primitive regions with non-reflective consciousness of instincts, followed by the emergence of reflective consciousness of the sensations and impulses that comprise these instincts (this subjective experience is what he termed "primordial emotions"), then reflective consciousness of surroundings evolves, followed by the emergence of reflective consciousness of memories and behavioural options.

Antonio Damasio, too, argues "It is likely that homeostatic feelings were the inaugural phenomena of consciousness in evolution ..." and that ongoing, moment to moment consciousness relies on a healthy uninterrupted connection between the interoceptive nervous system and the body's non-nervous tissues and chemical systems.

References

Emotion
Limbic system
Mental processes